Court Square is a park in Springfield, Massachusetts.

Court Square may also refer to:
One Court Square, a building in New York City
Court Square–23rd Street station, a subway station in New York City
Court Square Fountain, a monument in Montgomery, Alabama
Goochland County Court Square, a district in Goochland County, Virginia

See also
Courthouse Square (disambiguation)
Courthouse Square Historic District (disambiguation)
Court Square Historic District (disambiguation)